Caribicus darlingtoni, also known commonly as Darlington's galliwasp and the Hispaniolan striped galliwasp, is a species of lizard in the family Diploglossidae endemic to the Dominican Republic on the Caribbean island of Hispaniola.

Taxonomy 
It was formerly classified in the genus Celestus, but was moved to Caribicus in 2021.

Etymology
The specific name, darlingtoni, is in honor of American entomologist Philip Jackson Darlington Jr.

Habitat

Description
Females are about one fifth smaller, only attaining  SVL.

Reproduction
C. darlingtoni is oviparous.

References

Further reading
Cochran DM (1939). "Diagnoses of three new lizards and a frog from the Dominican Republic". Proceedings of the New England Zoölogical Club 18: 1–3. (Celestus darlingtoni, new species, p. 2).
Schools M, Hedges SB (2021). "Phylogenetics, classification, and biogeography of the Neotropical forest lizards (Squamata, Diploglossidae)". Zootaxa 4974 (2): 201–257. (Caribicus darlingtoni, new combination).
Schwartz A, Henderson RW (1991). Amphibians and Reptiles of the West Indies: Descriptions, Distributions, and Natural History. Gainesville: University of Florida Press. 720 pp. . (Celestus darlingtoni, p. 372).

Caribicus
Reptiles described in 1939
Reptiles of the Dominican Republic
Endemic fauna of the Dominican Republic
Taxa named by Doris Mable Cochran